Jalan Kuala Selangor–Bestari Jaya or Jalan Rawang on Kuala Selangor side (Selangor state route B33) is a major road in Selangor, Malaysia.

List of junctions

Roads in Selangor